Munich-Obermenzing station is a railway station in the Pasing-Obermenzing borough of Munich, Germany.

References

External links

Munich S-Bahn stations
Obermenzing
Railway stations in Germany opened in 1905
Pasing-Obermenzing